Celebic can refer to:

Celebic languages, a group of Austronesian language spoken primarily in Sulawesi, Indonesia
Čelebić, a village in Bosnia and Herzegovina
Čelebić (surname), a Serbo-Croatian surname

See also
 Čelebići (disambiguation)
 Çelebi (disambiguation)